Quebro is a corregimiento in Mariato District, Veraguas Province, Panama with a population of 1,129 as of 2010. Its population as of 1990 was 1,050; its population as of 2000 was 1,060.

References

Corregimientos of Veraguas Province